Volvox Turbo is the debut album from Manorexia.  It was released in 2001 by Ectopic Ents, and is catalog #ECT ENTS 021.

Volvox Turbo was a limited edition album self-distributed by J. G. Thirlwell.  It was sold exclusively at the Official Foetus Website and at Foetus shows during the tour for Flow.

Track listing

Personnel 
Drew Anderson – mastering
Steve Schwartz – art direction
J. G. Thirlwell – instruments, arrangements, production

References

External links 
 Volvox Turbo at foetus.org

2001 debut albums
Manorexia albums
Albums produced by JG Thirlwell